Open Window is an accredited private higher education provider. It was established in 1993 as an art school. It has since expanded into an institute offering three bachelor's degrees, a postgraduate degree and accredited certificates.

Bachelor of Film Arts  NQF 7, includes the following majors:

Film & Television

Sound Design

Motion Design

3D Animation

Game Design

Production Design

Screen Acting

Screenwriting

Bachelor of Interaction Design  NQF 7, includes the following majors:

Interaction Design

Interaction Development

Three-dimensional Design

Bachelor of Arts in Visual Communication Design  NQF 7, includes the following majors:

Communication Design

Illustration

Photography

Bachelor of Arts Honours in Visual Communication  NQF 8

A four-year Honours degrees includes a mix of practical work, critical and creative thinking, as well as research.

All qualifications are accredited by the Council on Higher Education (CHE) and are registered with the South African Qualifications Authority (SAQA).

Open Window is also registered at MICT Seta (Accreditation Number: ACC/2016/07/0012) for the following programmes:

 National Certificate: 3D Animation and Visual Effects NQF Level 5

 National Certificate: Film and Television Production NQF Level 5

 FET Certificate: Photography NQF Level 4

 Certificate Design Techniques NQF Level 5

External links
Open Window

Higher education in South Africa
Universities in Gauteng
Educational institutions established in 1993
1993 establishments in South Africa